Talk That Talk is the ninth album by The Jazz Crusaders recorded in 1965 and released on the Pacific Jazz label.

Reception

AllMusic rated the album with 4½ stars; in their review, Scott Yanow said: "The solos (particularly by tenor saxophonist Wilton Felder and trombonist Wayne Henderson) are fine but the material (a few group originals plus pop tunes such as "Walk on By" and "Hey Girl") is uniformly lightweight and rather forgettable".

Track listing 
 "Walkin' My Cat Named Dog" (Norma Tanega) - 2:38
 "Studewood" (Wayne Henderson) - 2:15
 "I Can't Believe You Love Me" (Clarence Gaskill, Jimmy McHugh) - 2:39
 "There Is a Time (Le Temps)" (Gene Lees, Charles Aznavour, Jeff Davis) - 2:06
 "Hey Girl" (Gerry Goffin, Carole King) - 2:23
 "Uptight (Everything's Alright)" (Stevie Wonder, Sylvia Moy, Henry Cosby) - 2:30
 "Arrastao" (Edu Lobo, Vinícius de Moraes) - 2:38
 "Mohair Sam" (Dallas Frazier) - 2:28
 "Walk On By" (Burt Bacharach, Hal David) - 2:49
 "1, 2, 3" (John Medora, David White, Len Barry) - 2:43
 "The Shadow Do" (Henderson) - 2:39
 "Turkish Black" (Wilton Felder) - 2:16

Personnel 
The Jazz Crusaders
Wayne Henderson - trombone
Wilton Felder - tenor saxophone
Joe Sample - piano
Leroy Vinnegar - bass
Stix Hooper - drums
Overdubbed unidentified big band

References 

The Jazz Crusaders albums
1966 albums
Pacific Jazz Records albums